Srilekha Parthasarathy (is a Tamil singer. She is commonly referred to by her first name Srilekha. She began her professional career in 2000, when she recorded the jingle for the "Idhayam Oil" advertisement, which appeared on Jothika. She describes the jingle as her ticket into the Tamil music industry.

Early life
Srilekha was born in a Tamil family and grew up in Delhi. She completed her schooling from DTEA senior Secondary School, New Delhi. South Indian by birth, she learned both North and South Indian languages and music, as well as Western music. At age four, she won first prize in the annual All India Children's Music Competition in New Delhi.

Career
Her debut was with music director Harris Jayaraj, for the song called "Yedho Ondru" from the movie Lesa Lesa.

She recorded several songs for films, including "Poo Mugam Siricha" for the movie Junction, "Kaadhalaagi" with S.P. Balasubramaniam in Pop Carn, "Don't worry be Happy" for the movie Whistle, and "Sutthi Sutthi Varuven" for the movie Sena.

She later recorded "Kalyaanam dhaan" from the movie Saamy. This was followed by "Vinodhane" from Thennavan, "Vaa Masakatre" from Kurumbu and "Ayurvedha Azhagi" from Thiruda Thirudi.

Her more recent recordings include "Dhimsu Kattai", "Chinna Veeda", "Kokku Meena Thinguma" and "Pacchakili Pacchakili". Other songs of Srilekha include "Mummy Chellama", "Bambara Kannu", "Vecchukka Vecchukka Va", "Garuda Garuda", and "Thavilu Thavilu".

She appears in STAR Vijay's drama serial Dharmayutham. She is married to singer M J Shriram.

Tamil movie songs
Songs she has sung in Tamil movies:

Actress
Television

Awards
 Best Female Playback singer for the song "Vecchikka Vecchikava" from M Kumaran S/O Mahalakshmi
 Youth Icon (2004), by Damodharan College of Engineering & Management Studies, Coimbatore
 Young Achiever Award (2004), by Sangam Kala group
 Best Young Playback Singer Award, (2004), by TVK Cultural Academy

Live shows
She has done more than 200 live shows in India and other countries, including Singapore, USA, Canada, Kuwait and Colombo. She performs live shows for companies, such as Hyundai, Aircel, Touchtel, Airtel, Samsung, Bpl Mobiles, TVS group and Cognizant Technology Solutions, Ajuba solutions. She is a judge in Star Vijay TV's "Super Singer" series.

Fan club
She has a fan club "No One Noticed Srilekha" in Portland, Oregon, US, the first for a Tamil singer in Oregon. She has fans all over the world.

References

External links 

 

Year of birth missing (living people)
Living people
Indian women playback singers
Singers from Delhi
Tamil playback singers
Women musicians from Delhi
21st-century Indian singers
21st-century Indian women singers
Actresses in Tamil television